In Kazakhstan, there are 25 specially protected areas, including 10 nature reserves and 11 national parks. These environmental institutions owned by the state. 
 Aksu-Zhabagly State Nature Reserve
 Almaty State Natural Reserve
 Naurzum State Nature Reserve
 Barsakelmessky State Nature Reserve
 Korgalzhyn State Nature Reserve
 Markakolsky State Nature Reserve
 Ustyurt State Nature Reserve
 West-Altai State Nature Reserve
 Alakol State Nature Reserve
 Karatau State Nature Reserve

Protected areas of Kazakhstan